Terningen Lighthouse is a lighthouse in the municipality of Hitra in Trøndelag county, Norway. The light marks one of the main channels that leads to the Trondheimsfjorden.

The concrete tower is painted white and it has a red roof. The light is activated from July 21 until May 16 each year. The light is inactive and unnecessary during the late spring and early summer due to the midnight sun.

See also

 List of lighthouses in Norway
 Lighthouses in Norway

References

External links
 Norsk Fyrhistorisk Forening 
 

Lighthouses completed in 1833
Hitra
Lighthouses in Trøndelag